Donald Vivian Roach (31 July 1940 – 3 July 2011) was an Australian rules footballer who played for  in the Victorian Football League (VFL) and for West Adelaide and Norwood Football Clubs in the South Australian National Football League (SANFL).

Roach, a left footed flanker, played his early football at SANFL club West Adelaide, for whom he debuted in 1958 and won the SANFL premiership in 1961. He moved to Melbourne in 1964 VFL season and joined Hawthorn but only stayed for two seasons playing 33 games for the Hawks.

In 1966 he returned to West Adelaide and was appointed captain-coach. That same year he represented South Australia at the Hobart Carnival, his second interstate carnival having competed in the 1961 Brisbane Carnival. He was selected into the All-Australian team for his efforts in Brisbane.

After taking a break from the game in 1969 Roach returned to action the following season at his new club Norwood where he would finish his career. When Roach retired in 1972 his final tally of games in the SANFL amounted to 204 and he also represented South Australia on nine occasions. He went on to serve the league as an administrator.

Don Roach was an inaugural member of the South Australian Football Hall of Fame in 2002, and he is also a member of the West Adelaide Football Club Hall of Fame.

References

Holmesby, Russell and Main, Jim (2007). The Encyclopedia of AFL Footballers. 7th ed. Melbourne: Bas Publishing.

External links

1940 births
Australian rules footballers from South Australia
Hawthorn Football Club players
West Adelaide Football Club players
West Adelaide Football Club coaches
Norwood Football Club players
All-Australians (1953–1988)
South Australian Football Hall of Fame inductees
2011 deaths